"24/7" is a song by American R&B/pop music trio 3T, released as the second single from their debut album, Brotherhood (1995). It was released only in Europe and Oceania.

Critical reception
Alan Jones from Music Week wrote that the song "is a delicate and pretty release, slightly faster in tempo, but still not working up a head of sweat. Their harmonies are light and sweet and recall Uncle Michael at his best. Another hit."

Track listing
 CD maxi #1
"24/7" (Radio Edit) - 3:56
"24/7" (Maurice's Radio Edit) - 4:35
"24/7" (Linslee's Master Mix) - 4:34
"24/7" (Linslee's Live Mix) - 4:34

 CD maxi #2
"24/7" (Album Version) - 4:39
"24/7" (Maurice's 24 Hour Club Mix) - 6:30
"24/7" (Maurice's 24/7 Dub) - 4:42
"Anything" (Spanish Version) - 4:34

Official versions
 "24/7" (Album Version) - 4:39
 "24/7" (Radio Edit) - 3:56
 "24/7" (Linslee's Live Mix) - 4:34
 "24/7" (Linslee's Master Mix) - 4:34
 "24/7" (Maurice's Radio Edit) - 4:35
 "24/7" (Maurice's 24 Hour Club Mix) - 6:30
 "24/7" (Maurice's 24/7 Dub) - 4:42

Charts

References

External links
 

1995 singles
3T songs
1995 songs
Epic Records singles